The 1889–90 Scottish Cup was the 17th season of Scotland's most prestigious football knockout competition. Queen's Park defeated rivals Vale of Leven 
2–1 in a replayed final.

Calendar

Teams
All 158 teams entered the competition in the first round.

First round
Camelon, Clyde, Dumfries Harp, Dunfermline, Edinburgh University, Kirkintilloch Athletic, Lanemark and Lochgilphead received a bye to the second round.

Matches

Replays

Notes

Sources:

Second round
Ayr Athletic, Champfleurie, Edinburgh University, Kilsyth Wanderers, Pollokshaws and Wishaw Thistle received a bye to the third round.

Matches

Replays

Sources:

Third round
Cowdenbeath received a bye to the fourth round.

Matches

Replays

Notes

Sources:

Fourth round

Matches

Replays

Sources:

Fifth round
Hibernian, Kilbirnie, Leith Athletic and 3rd Lanark RV received a bye to the quarter-finals.

Matches

Replay

Quarter-finals

Semi-finals

Final

Original

Replay

Teams

Teams were unchanged for the replay.

References

Cup
Scottish Cup seasons
Scot